The 2019 Qatar Total Open was a professional women's tennis tournament played on hard courts. It was the 17th edition of the event and a Premier tournament on the 2019 WTA Tour. It took place at the International Tennis and Squash complex in Doha, Qatar between 11 and 16 February 2019.

Point distribution

Prize money

1Qualifiers prize money is also the Round of 32 prize money.
*per team

Singles main-draw entrants

Seeds

1 Rankings as of February 4, 2019.

Other entrants
The following players received wildcards into the singles main draw:
  Fatma Al-Nabhani
  Ons Jabeur
  Elina Svitolina
  Caroline Wozniacki

The following players received entry from the qualifying draw:
  Anna Blinkova
  Karolína Muchová 
  Ajla Tomljanović
  Zhu Lin

The following players received entry as lucky losers:
  Lara Arruabarrena
  Polona Hercog
  Kristýna Plíšková
  Alison Riske
  Samantha Stosur

Withdrawals
Before the tournament
  Ashleigh Barty → replaced by  Polona Hercog
  Caroline Garcia → replaced by  Lara Arruabarrena
  Madison Keys → replaced by  Kateřina Siniaková
  Naomi Osaka → replaced by  Barbora Strýcová
  Karolína Plíšková → replaced by  Kristýna Plíšková
  Wang Qiang → replaced by  Alison Riske
  Caroline Wozniacki → replaced by  Samantha Stosur

Doubles main-draw entrants

Seeds 

 Rankings are as of February 4, 2019.

Other entrants
The following pairs received wildcards into the doubles main draw:
  Fatma Al-Nabhani  /  Mubaraka Al-Naimi 
  Karolína Plíšková /  Kristýna Plíšková

The following pair received entry as alternates:
  Ons Jabeur /  Alison Riske

Withdrawals 
Before the tournament
  Karolína Plíšková (viral illness)

Champions

Singles

  Elise Mertens def.  Simona Halep, 3–6, 6–4, 6–3

Doubles

  Chan Hao-ching /  Latisha Chan def.  Anna-Lena Grönefeld /  Demi Schuurs, 6–1, 3–6, [10–6]

References

External links
 

Qatar Total Open
Qatar Ladies Open
2019 in Qatari sport
Qatar Total Open